Rajya Sabha elections were held on various dates in 2008, to elect members of the Rajya Sabha, Indian Parliament's upper chamber. The elections were held  to elect respectively 55 members from 15 states, four members from Karnataka and one member from Mizoram and Aruncahl Pradesh, and 11 members from two states for the Council of States, the Rajya Sabha.

Elections
Elections were held to elect members from various states.

Members elected
The following members are elected in the elections held in 2008.
The list is incomplete.

State - Member - Party

Bye-elections
The bye-elections were also held for the vacant seats from the State of Bihar, Nagaland, West Bengal and Bihar, West Bengal, and Madhya Pradesh.

 Bye-election was held on 26 March 2008 for vacancy from Bihar due to death of seating member Motiur Rahman on 18/12/2007 with term ending on   07/07/2010. Dr Ejaz Ali of JDU got elected unopposed.

 Bye-elections were held on 26 June 2008 for vacancy from Nagaland due to resignation of seating member T. R. Zeliang of NPF on 24/03/2008 with term ending on 02/04/2010, from West Bengal due to resignation of seating member Barun Mukherjee of AIFB on 06/05/2008 with term ending on 02/04/2012, and from Bihar due to disqualification of seating member Jai Narain Prasad Nishad of BJP on 26/03/2008 with term ending on 19/07/2010.H. Khekiho Zhimomi of NPF for Nagaland, Rajiv Pratap Rudy  of BJP & R.C.Singh of CPI for West Bengal became members.
 
 Bye-election was held on 21 November 2008 for vacancy from West Bengal due to resignation of seating member Debabrata Biswas of AIFB on 23/09/2010 with term ending on 02/04/2014. Barun Mukherji of AIFB became the member

 Bye-election was held on 22 January 2009 for vacancy from Madhya Pradesh due to death of seating member Laxminarayan  Sharma of BJP on 17/10/2008 with term ending on 29/06/2010. Narendra Singh Tomar of BJP became the member.

References

2008 elections in India
2008